Robert A. Jensen (born 1965) is an American writer and crisis management expert. He is best known for his responses to the Oklahoma City Bombing, 9/11, Hurricane Katrina and the 2004 Indian Ocean earthquake and tsunami.

Biography

Robert A. Jensen was born in the Bay Area, California and spent most of his childhood on the west coast. His last two years of high school were completed in Florida at Admiral Farragut Academy, a Naval Honor Military high school whose alumni include Alan Shepard and Charles Duke. He graduated from California State University, Fresno with a Degree in Criminology – Law Enforcement. 

Jensen was commissioned as a US Army Officer in 1986 with an initial assignment in Field Artillery at Fort Sill, but soon took the Pershing Officer Course that led him to become a Launch Control Officer in Germany. While serving, Robert was also the commander of the 54th Quartermaster Company – Mortuary Affairs. As Commander, he responded to incidents such as the 1996 Croatia USAF CT-43 crash and the Oklahoma City bombing.

Jensen is the former Chairman of Kenyon International Emergency Services. He has directed and been involved in response and recovery efforts for numerous international large-scale crises, typically terrorist attacks, criminal and civil investigations, natural disasters, and countless transportation accidents – most involving large-scale loss of life. These have included complex events such as bombings in the UN Headquarters in Baghdad, 2002 Bali bombings, the September 11 attacks, seizure of the In Amenas gas plant, the 2015 Sousse attacks, the 2004 Indian Ocean earthquake and tsunami, the 2010 Haiti earthquake, Hurricane Katrina and multiple large-scale aircraft, rail and maritime disasters.

Jensen has contributed to international and national news outlets, including Business Insider, NPR and Univision,  as to what families and the general public could expect after the Surfside condominium building collapse.
The New York Times, Associated Press and BuzzFeed News interviewed Jensen regarding the number of COVID-19 fatalities in New York City.  He has provided behind the scenes interviews to The Houston Chronicle, GQ Magazine and The Telegraph about crisis and disaster management. Jensen has also provided commentary on leadership, crises and their aftermath on the Oklahoma City Bombing, 9/11, Bombing of UN Headquarters in Iraq, Hurricane Katrina, 2004 Asian Tsunami, 2010 Haitian Earthquake, Grenfell Tower Fire, Pandemic and multiple aircraft disasters including Germanwings Flight  FU 9525, Helios Flight 522, Malaysia Airlines Flight 17 and Malaysia Airlines Flight 370 to media outlets including the Associated Press, Reuters, The New York Times, Wall Street Journal, The Telegraph, BBC, CNN and Sky News.

He has published one technical book and several crisis management articles in publications such as the Houston Business Journal. His first book, Mass Fatality and Casualty Incidents: A Field Guide, a guide to disaster responses to events that result in mass fatalities, was published by CRC Press, a division of British multinational publisher, Routledge, Jensen's second book, Personal Effects: What Recovering the Dead Teaches Me About Caring for the Living, will be published in September 2021 by St. Martin's Press.

Personal life
Jensen is married to Brandon Jones  and has one daughter.

Bibliography

References

Sources

External links
Official Website
Kenyon Website

California State University, Fresno alumni
American writers
1965 births
Living people